Albina/Mississippi station is a light rail station on the MAX Yellow Line in Portland, Oregon, United States. It is the second stop northbound on the Interstate MAX extension.  The station is located in the median of Interstate Avenue near the intersection of N Albina Street. The station serves the Lower Albina Industrial District, Emanuel Hospital, and an emerging and redeveloping commercial district.  The station is a center platform, with its main artistic theme drawing upon the lively jazz scene that thrived in Albina in the post-World War II era. During planning for Interstate MAX, this station was located at the intersection of Interstate Avenue and Russell Street. The Union Pacific Railroad raised concerns on conflicts between pedestrian and truck traffic at the Russell Street intermodal entrance to Albina Yard, which led designers to shift the station two blocks south.

Bus line connections
This station is served by the following bus lines:
35 – Macadam/Greeley
85 – Swan Island

References

External links

Station information (with northbound ID number) from TriMet
Station information (with southbound ID number) from TriMet
MAX Light Rail Stations – more general TriMet page

MAX Light Rail stations
MAX Yellow Line
Railway stations in the United States opened in 2004
2004 establishments in Oregon
North Portland, Oregon
Eliot, Portland, Oregon
Railway stations in Portland, Oregon